The 2016 Bethune–Cookman Wildcats football team represented Bethune–Cookman University in the 2016 NCAA Division I FCS football season. They were led by second-year head coach Terry Sims and played their home games at Municipal Stadium. They were a member of the Mid-Eastern Athletic Conference (MEAC). They finished the season 4–6, 4–4 in MEAC play to finish in a two-way tie for fifth place.

Schedule

The game between Alcorn State and Bethune–Cookman was canceled due to inclement weather.  The game was delayed due to lightning in the second quarter with 7:13 remaining. Alcorn was leading 13–7. Both schools' athletic directors decided not to reschedule the game, thus declaring it a "no contest".
The game between North Carolina A&T and Bethune–Cookman was rescheduled from October 13, 2016 due to damages sustained to Daytona Beach from Hurricane Matthew.
The game between South Carolina State and Bethune–Cookman was postponed in advance of the arrival of Hurricane Matthew. The game was rescheduled for November 26 on October 7, 2016.
Source: Schedule

Game summaries

Alcorn State

Game was cancelled due to inclement weather and was declared a "no contest".

at North Texas

Tennessee State

at Savannah State

North Carolina Central

North Carolina A&T

at Norfolk State

Delaware State

at Morgan State

vs. Florida A&M

at South Carolina State

References

Bethune-Cookman
Bethune–Cookman Wildcats football seasons
Bethune